Li Qingtong is a Chinese professional football player who plays for Meizhou Hakka. She studied at the Guangzhou Sport University.

References

1999 births
Living people
Chinese women's footballers
China women's international footballers
Footballers at the 2020 Summer Olympics
Olympic footballers of China
Women's association footballers not categorized by position